Radu Mareș (March 3, 1941 – March 26, 2016) was a Romanian prose writer and journalist.

Bibliography 
 Anna sau pasărea paradisului (1972)
 Vine istoria (1972)
 Cel iubit (1975)
 Caii sălbatici (1981)
 Pe cont propriu (1986)
 Anul trecut în Calabria (2002)
 Manual de sinucidere (2003)
 Ecluza (2006)
 Când ne vom întoarce (2010)
 Deplasarea spre roșu (2012)
 Sindromul Robinson (2014)

References 

1941 births
2016 deaths
Romanian writers
Romanian novelists
Romanian essayists
Romanian journalists
People from Suceava County
Babeș-Bolyai University alumni